Sheldon Jaffery (April 22, 1934 – July 10, 2003) was an American bibliographer. An attorney by profession, he was an aficionado of Weird Tales magazine, Arkham House books, the weird menace pulps, and related topics. 

He died in 2003 of septic shock contracted while being treated for lung cancer.

Works
 Double Trouble: A Bibliographic Chronicle of Ace Mystery Doubles, Starmont Popular Culture Series no. 11, Borgo Press, 1987. .
 Collector's Index to Weird Tales (with Fred Cook). Bowling Green State University Popular Press, August 1985.  .
 Future and Fantastic Worlds: Bibliography of DAW Books, Starmont Reference Guide, No. 4, 1987.  .
 Horrors and Unpleasantries: A Bibliographical History & Collector's Price Guide to Arkham House, Bowling Green State University Popular Press, 1982. .
 Selected Tales of Grim and Grue from the Horror Pulps, Bowling Green State University Popular Press, 1987. .
 Sensuous Science Fiction From the Weird and Spicy Pulps, Bowling Green State University Popular Press, 1984. .
 The Weirds, Starmont House Inc., 1987. .
 The Arkham House Companion: Fifty Years of Arkham House, Starmont House Inc., 1989. . (A revised, updated and expanded edition of Horrors and Unpleasantries).

Unpublished work
Double Futures: An Annotated Bibliography of the Ace Science Fiction Doubles. Planned for release by Borgo Press in 1999  (assigned ), but never issued.

References

Clute, John, "Sheldon R. Jaffery", in

External links
Sheldon Jaffery profile

1934 births
2003 deaths
American bibliographers